Jean Adelard Mayanga Maku (born 31 October 1948) is a Congolese former footballer who played as a forward for Zaire in the 1974 FIFA World Cup. He also played for AS Vita Club.

Mayanga scored three goals for Zaire at the 1972 African Cup of Nations finals. He represented Zaire in international competition as late as 1979,  appearing in a 1980 African Cup of Nations qualifying match versus Guinea in Kinshasa.

In 2006, he was selected by CAF as one of the best 200 African football players of the last 50 years.

References

External links
 FIFA profile

Living people
1948 births
Footballers from Kinshasa
Africa Cup of Nations-winning players
Democratic Republic of the Congo footballers
Association football forwards
Democratic Republic of the Congo international footballers
AS Vita Club players
1974 FIFA World Cup players
1970 African Cup of Nations players
1972 African Cup of Nations players
1974 African Cup of Nations players
Democratic Republic of the Congo football managers
Democratic Republic of the Congo national football team managers
21st-century Democratic Republic of the Congo people